Finnmarksløpet is the world's northernmost sled dog race. It is also Europe's longest sled dog race. The race starts on Saturday of the 10th week of the year and goes across Finnmark in Norway. The race was first run in 1981.

Open Class 
Daily stages, totaling 1100 km
 Stage 1 : Alta – Jotka, 50 km  
 Stage 2 : Jotka – Skoganvarre, 58 km
 Stage 3 : Skoganvarre – Levajok, 88 km  
 Stage 4 : Levajok – Skippagurra, 100 km
 Stage 5 : Skippagurra – Neiden, 94 km
 Stage 6 : Neiden – Kirkenes, 75 km
 Stage 7 : Kirkenes – Ellentjern, 115 km
 Stage 8 : Ellentjern - Neiden, 77 km
 Stage 9 : Neiden – Varangerbotn, 88 km
 Stage 10 : Varangerbotn – Sirbma, 74 km
 Stage 11: Sirbma – Levajok, 70 km
 Stage 12: Levajok – Karasjok, 85 km
 Stage 13: Karasjok – Jotka, 82 km
 Stage 14: Jotka – Alta, 50 km

Winners

Limited Class 
Daily stages, totalling 478 km
 Stage 1: Alta – Jotka, 50 km
 Stage 2: Jotka – Jergul, 78 km
 Stage 3: Jergul – Karasjok, 67 km
 Stage 4: Karasjok - Levajok, 85 km
 Stage 5: Levajok – Skoganvarre, 90 km
 Stage 6: Skoganvarre – Jotka, 58 km
 Stage 7: Jotka – Alta 50 km

Winners

Junior Class 
Daily stages, totalling 205 km
 Stage 1: Alta – Jotka, 50 km
 Stage 2: Jotka – Suossjavre, 55 km
 Stage 3: Suossjavre – Jotka, 50 km
 Stage 4: Jotka – Alta 50 km

Winners

See also
 Arctic Alps Cup (La Grande Odyssée and Finnmarksløpet)
 Iditarod
 La Grande Odyssée (France and Switzerland)
 List of sled dog races

References

External links
 Finnmarksløpet

1981 establishments in Norway
Dog sledding races
Recurring sporting events established in 1981